Cromemco DOS or CDOS (an abbreviation for Cromemco Disk Operating System) is a CP/M-like operating system by Cromemco designed to allow users of Cromemco microcomputer systems to create and manipulate disk files using symbolic names.

Overview
 
CDOS was written in Zilog Z80 machine code. Due to the number of available programs available to run under Digital Research CP/M at that time, CDOS was designed to be upwards CP/M-compatible. Many programs written for CP/M versions up to and including version 1.33 run without modification under CDOS. However, programs written for CDOS generally do not run under CP/M.

The Cromemco Z-2 had the ability to run Cromemco DOS. Besides CP/M 2.2 and Cromix, the Cromemco System One can also run Cromemco DOS. The Cromemco C-10 personal computer, introduced in 1982, also ran CDOS.

An emulator for a Cromemco CDOS system exists.

Commands
The following list of commands are supported by Cromemco DOS.

Intrinsic commands

 BYE
 DIR
 ERA
 REN
 SAVE
 TYPE

Later versions also support the ATTR command.

Extrinsic command programs

 @ (Batch)
 DUMP
 EDIT
 INIT (Initialize)
 STAT (Disk Status)
 WRTSYS (Write System)
 XFER (Transfer)

Later versions also support the MEMTEST command.

See also
 Harry Garland
 Roger Melen

References

External links

 x:\static\S100\cromemco\CDOS

Discontinued operating systems
Disk operating systems
Microcomputer software
Proprietary operating systems
Cromemco